Nanoprobe can mean:
 Nanoprobe (device), real devices for seeing very small objects
 A fictional device used by the Borg (Star Trek)